Elateropsis lineata is a species of beetle in the family Cerambycidae found in South America in countries such as Chile.

References 

Prioninae
Beetles described in 1758
Taxa named by Carl Linnaeus